Collins railway station is located in the community of Collins, Ontario, Canada. This station is currently in use by Via Rail. The transcontinental Canadian trains stop here.

External links
 Collins railway station

Via Rail stations in Ontario
Railway stations in Thunder Bay District